Tomas Schmit (born 13 July 1943 in Thier, now part of Wipperfürth, died 4 October 2006 in Berlin, Germany) was an artist and author associated with the Fluxus movement of the early 1960s. During the subsequent 40 years, he created drawings, texts, books and artists' books. From the late 1960s until his death, he continuously exhibited in international galleries. With his series of drawings, he is represented in renowned museums and collections: among them Museum Ludwig in Cologne and the Collection of Harald Falckenberg in Hamburg. Schmit's works are represented by the galleries Michael Werner in Cologne / New York, Marlene Frei in Zurich, Rudolf Springer and Barbara Wien in Berlin and the Edition Armin Hundertmark in Gran Canaria, Spain.

His estate is maintained and made accessible as the Tomas Schmit Archive, situated in Berlin and administered by Barbara Wien. Editorial endeavors of the archive are to support the reception of Tomas Schmit's oeuvre; to edit and publish Tomas Schmit's published and unpublished texts, and to collect his complete correspondence with George Brecht, Peter Brötzmann, Stanley Brouwn, Ludwig Gosewitz, Wulf Herzogenrath, Dick Higgins, Arthur Köpcke, George Maciunas, Nam June Paik, Evan Parker, Stefan Ripplinger, Andrea Tippel, Barbara Wien, Emmett Williams and others. The archive also supports solo and group shows with loans, as well as helping publications about Tomas Schmit by providing photos and text translations.

Life and career
Schmit has played a considerable role in shaping the radical questioning of civil art and approaches to new aesthetics. It was his correspondence with George Maciunas that made a theoretical discussion on the political and aesthetic concept of the Fluxus period possible. As an artist, he took part in Fluxus events that are nowadays considered milestones in the art of the 1960s. As organiser, he arranged for the legendary event "20th July TU Aachen" 1964 (with Beuys, Köpcke, Vostell, Paik amongst others). In 1982, in the book 1962 Wiesbaden Fluxus 1982, he wrote the theoretical text "about f" which represents one of the rare profound evaluations of the ideas of Fluxus from the artist's perspective. Friends and colleagues who he worked with and who appreciated him due to his consequent artistic position and wrote about him, include Nam June Paik, George Brecht, Arthur Köpcke, Ludwig Gosewitz and Dieter Roth – just to mention a few. In 1982, Dieter Roth adjudged him the scholarship of the Rembrandt-Prize which had been awarded to him. In 1986, the Kurt-Schwitters-Prize of the City Hanover was awarded to Schmit.

Schmit pulled out of the active Fluxus actions early, as he was against an adulteration of the radical potential. It is also this potential which his probably most important working principle is based on: "what I learned from f., along with many other things: what can be mastered by a sculpture, doesn't have to be erected as a building; what can be brought by a painting, doesn't have to be made as a sculpture; what can be accomplished in a drawing, doesn't have to become a painting; what can be cleared on a scrap of paper, doesn't need to be done as a drawing; and what can be settled in the head, doesn't even require a paper scrap!".In the following decades, he developed works that comprise several thousand drawings. He published editions and books. His main topics are language, logic, paradoxes, biology, cybernetics, cerebral research, behaviour research and apperception theory. In 1989, his book "first draft (of central aesthetics)" provided an introduction to cerebral research, which the cyberneticist Valentin Braitenberg characterized in the following way:
"I actually intend to recommend this book when some physicist or whatever other beginner, as it often happens, will again ask me for an introduction to cerebral research. I suppose, it took a poet to grasp the charm of the material access to psychology, including the pleasure in self-critical accuracy. Consequently, the book is an antipode to what ever so often annoys you: the belittling of events and concealment of problems that popular science uses to ingratiate with the people – but, thus, only shows its disrespect for the audience."

The last publication about Schmit has been published in 2008 under the title Dreizehn Montagsgespräche and will soon be republished in English and with additional materials (Wiens Verlag, Berlin). The book consists of thirteen conversations between the artist and the art historian Wilma Lukatsch, which focus around the artist's life, his work principles and collaborations.

Other upcoming projects (both in September 2021) include a reprint of his catalogues of works with an updated and extended version of the fourth catalogue (Verlag der Buchhandlung Walther and Franz König, Cologne, and Wiens Verlag, Berlin) as well as an exhibition project organized by Neuer Berlin Kunstverein (n.b.k.) in collaboration with the Kupferstichkabinett Berlin, Hamburger Bahnhof - Museum for Contemporary Art and the tomas schmit archive.

Schmit is buried in the cemetery of the Dorotheenstadt and Friedrichswerder communities in Berlin-Mitte.

Catalogues of Works 
 katalog 1. Koelnischer Kunstverein, Cologne 1978.
 katalog 2. Daad Gallery, Berlin, and Sprengelmuseum, Hannover 1987.
 katalog 3. Portikus, Frankfurt/Main 1997.
 katalog 4. Verlag der Buchhandlung Walther König, Cologne 2007.

Publications 

 tomas schmit: das gute dünken. Berlin 1970 (self-published).
 tomas schmit: erster entwurf (einer zentralen ästhetik). Berlin 1989 (self-published).
 tomas schmit liest eigene texte, vol. 1, Audio-CD. Wiens Verlag, Berlin 2005.
 tomas schmit liest eigene texte, vol. 2, Audio-CD. Wiens Verlag, Berlin 2005.
 tomas schmit: Dreizehn Montagsgespräche (Questions by Wilma Lukatsch). Wiens Verlag, Berlin 2008.

Awards 

 1981: Research Residency of the Stiftung Kunstfonds, Bonn
 1982: Stipend of the Rembrandt-Prize (Dieter Roth), Basel
 1986: Kurt-Schwitters-Award of the city of Hanover
 1990: Arthur Køpckes ærespris, Copenhagen

References
Notes

External links 
 Galerie Barbara Wien, Berlin
tomas schmit archiv, Berlin

1943 births
2006 deaths
People from Wipperfürth
Fluxus
German artists
People from the Rhine Province